McClainville is an unincorporated community in Belmont County, in the U.S. state of Ohio.

History
A post office called McClainville was established in 1893, and remained in operation until 1907. Besides the post office, McClainville had a large brick factory.

References

Unincorporated communities in Belmont County, Ohio
1893 establishments in Ohio
Populated places established in 1893
Unincorporated communities in Ohio